Dreamland was an Australian amusement park in the Melbourne suburb of St Kilda, which was opened on 2 November 1906.  It was demolished in 1909, except for the Figure Eight rollercoaster which remained open until 1914.

History 
In November 1906 Dreamland was opened in St Kilda, a suburb of Melbourne, Australia.  It was built on an area of wasteland which included a lagoon.  The lagoon had been drained in 1870 and the site had been unoccupied for more than a decade.

Dreamland was demolished in 1909, but in 1912 Luna Park was opened in the same area.  Luna Park is still open and operating today.

Past attractions
 Robson's Figure Eight rollercoaster.
 "The Trip to the Moon" in the "Dreamland Airship"
 San Francisco earthquake and fire.
 Ascent of Fujiyama. with descent via either the.
 "Down and Out".
 or the "Bump the Bumps".
 Hereafter
 The Rivers of the World.
 "The Unseen World" with its mystic caves.
 Hall of Illusion.
 Grecian Theatre.

See also
Luna Park, Melbourne

References

External links 
 Park History

Defunct amusement parks in Australia
1906 establishments in Australia
1909 disestablishments in Australia
Amusement parks in Victoria (Australia)
Demolished buildings and structures in Melbourne
Buildings and structures demolished in 1909
St Kilda, Victoria